Kelly Burke (born December 31, 1944) is an American model who was Playboy magazine's Playmate of the Month for its June 1966 issue. Her centerfold was photographed by William Figge.

Burke was born in Los Angeles, California.

According to The Playmate Book, Burke was pregnant while she was shooting her Playmate centerfold. She also was (at the time) the sister-in-law of 1965 Playmate of the Year Allison Parks.

See also
 List of people in Playboy 1960–1969

External links
 

1944 births
Living people
People from Los Angeles
1960s Playboy Playmates